Alberto Fernando Carvalho Oliveira (born 5 February 1965) was a leading Portuguese road cyclist in the late 1980s and early 1990s.

His strength was that of a great all-rounder, able to win tough mountain stages, time-trials and sprints; he was also known as a reckless descender and celebrated some spectacular crashes.

As the leader of the Ruquita team, he became a well-known cyclist in Spain, although his biggest victories came in Portugal, including the Volta ao Alentejo in 1989, the Volta ao Algarve in 1989 and 1990 and the Volta a Portugal in 1990.

He retired from cycling in 1994 and set up the Escola de Ciclismo Fernando Carvalho U18 and U23 race team, racing under the Dulcetextil colours from 2004-2006 and then L.A. Aluminios in 2007, as a part of the  team.

He also established a custom cycling clothing brand in 2002 under his own name selling cycling and triathlon clothing to clubs around the world.

Major results

1982
 1st Stage 10a Volta a Portugal
1984
 1st Stage 5 Volta ao Alentejo
 2nd Overall Grande Prémio Jornal de Notícias
 9th Overall Volta a Portugal
1985
 1st Stage 8 Volta a Portugal
1986
 1st  Overall Grande Prémio Jornal de Notícias
1st Stage 5
 2nd Road race, National Road Championships
 4th Overall Volta a Portugal
1st Mountains classification
1st Stage 5
1987
 5th Overall Volta ao Alentejo
1988
 5th Overall Volta a Portugal
1989
 1st  Overall Volta ao Algarve
1st Stage 1
 1st  Overall Grande Prémio Jornal de Notícias
 1st  Overall Volta ao Alentejo
1st Points classification
1st Stages 1, 4b (TTT), 7a & 8
 4th Overall GP Costa Azul
1st Prologue (TTT)
1990
 1st  Overall Volta a Portugal
1st Prologue (TTT) & Stages 7 & 16
 1st  Overall Volta ao Algarve
1st Stage 7
1993
 1st Overall GP Abimota
 1st Stage 14 Volta a Portugal
 2nd Overall Volta ao Algarve

References

External links
 

1965 births
Living people
Portuguese male cyclists
Volta a Portugal winners